Brinkhorst is a Dutch surname. Notable people with the surname include:

 Princess Laurentien of the Netherlands (born 1966), born Laurentien Brinkhorst
 Laurens-Jan Brinkhorst (born 1937), Dutch politician, father of Laurentien

Dutch-language surnames